The 22115 / 16 Lokmanya Tilak Terminus - Karmali AC Superfast Express is a Superfast Express express train of the AC Express series belonging to Indian Railways - Central Railway zone that runs between  and  in India.

Coaches

The 22115 / 16 Lokmanya Tilak Terminus - Karmali AC Superfast Express has 13 AC 3 tier, 3 AC 2 tier, 1 AC 1st Class & 2 End on Generator Coaches. It also carries a Pantry car coach .

As is customary with most train services in India, Coach Composition may be amended at the discretion of Indian Railways depending on demand.

 EOG consists of Luggage and Generator Coach
 B consists of AC 3 Tier Coach
 PC consists of Pantry Car Coach
 A consists of AC 2 Tier Coach
 H consists of First Class AC Coach

Service

As the average speed of the train is above , as per Indian Railways rules, its fare includes a Superfast surcharge.

Routeing

Traction

Earlier , the route was not electrified, a   based WDM 3D or a WDG 3A  locomotive powers the train up to its destination.
Both trains were hauled by an Currently as Konkan Railways have completed electrification, the train is now hauled by a Indian locomotive class WAP-7 from Lalaguda Shed

Operation

22115 Lokmanya Tilak Terminus - Karmali AC Superfast Express leaves  every Thursday at 00:50 AM & arriving  on same day at 10:40 AM.
 
22116 Karmali - Lokmanya Tilak Terminus AC Superfast Express leaves  every Thursday at 02:10 PM &  arrives  11:25 PM on the same day.

References

External links
22115 AC Express at India Rail Info
22116 AC Express at India Rail Info

Sister Trains
 Dadar Madgaon Jan Shatabdi Express
 Konkan Kanya Express
 Mandovi Express
 Mumbai CSMT - Karmali Tejas Express
 Mumbai LTT - Madgaon AC Double Decker Express

Transport in Mumbai
AC Express (Indian Railways) trains
Rail transport in Maharashtra
Rail transport in Goa
Konkan Railway
Transport in Panaji